Karel Hanika (born 14 April 1996) is a motorcycle racer from the Czech Republic. He is the 2013 Red Bull MotoGP Rookies Cup champion and the 2013 European Moto3 champion. He currently competes in the Alpe Adria International Road Race Superbike Championship, aboard a BMW S1000RR.

In 2014 and 2015, Hanika raced for the Ajo Motorsport team in the Moto3 world championship.

After two crash-filled seasons, he was dropped by Ajo and switched to Mahindra for the 2016 campaign. However, after failing to score a single point in seven races he was fired mid-season and replaced by Moto3 returnee Danny Webb.

Career statistics

Red Bull MotoGP Rookies Cup

Races by year
(key) (Races in bold indicate pole position, races in italics indicate fastest lap)

Grand Prix motorcycle racing

By season

Races by year
(key) (Races in bold indicate pole position; races in italics indicate fastest lap)

Superbike World Championship

Races by year
(key) (Races in bold indicate pole position; races in italics indicate fastest lap)

References

External links

Living people
1996 births
Czech motorcycle racers
Moto3 World Championship riders
Moto2 World Championship riders
Superbike World Championship riders
Sportspeople from Brno